Blood Games: A True Account of Family Murder is a true crime non-fiction book written by Jerry Bledsoe and published on November 1, 1991 by Dutton Books. The book recounts the murder of Lieth Von Stein. It was adapted into a television film titled Honor Thy Mother that premiered on CBS on April 26, 1992.

References

1991 non-fiction books
American non-fiction books
Dutton Penguin books
Non-fiction books adapted into films